Calvary Adelaide Hospital is a private hospital on Angas Street in the central business district of  Adelaide, the capital of South Australia, that opened in 2020, taking over and expanding the services of Calvary Wakefield Hospital and Calvary Rehabilitation Hospital. It is the largest private hospital in South Australia, providing acute medical and surgical care with inpatient and outpatient facilities, and orthopaedic, cardiac, and neurosurgical services. The 344-bed capacity building has 16 operating theatres and a 20-bed Level 3 intensive care unit with specialist intensivists 24 hours a day. The hospital is South Australia's only private provider of 24/7 accident and emergency care. 

The 12-storey building, over which Calvary Healthcare has a 30-year lease, was built by the John Holland Group and is owned by Commercial & General. The site, formerly a car park, is next to the South Australia Police headquarters.

References

Catholic hospitals in Oceania
Hospitals in Adelaide
Hospitals established in 2019
2019 establishments in Australia